Drachenbrunnen is a fountain at Oranienplatz in Kreuzberg, Berlin, Germany.

References

External links
 

Buildings and structures in Berlin
Fountains in Germany
Friedrichshain-Kreuzberg
Outdoor sculptures in Berlin